Qaleh-ye Abbasabad (also Romanized as Qal‘eh-ye ‘Abbāsābād; also known as ‘Abbāsābād) is a village in Astaneh Rural District, in the Central District of Shazand County, Markazi Province, Iran. At the 2006 census, its population was 677, in 183 families.

References 

Populated places in Shazand County